"Baby, I Love Your Way" is a song written and performed by English singer Peter Frampton, released as a single in September 1975. It first featured on Frampton's 1975 album, Frampton, where it segues from the previous track "Nassau".

A live version of the song was later released on his 1976 multi-platinum album Frampton Comes Alive!, where it gained popularity as a hit song, peaking at number 12 on the US Billboard Hot 100 chart. It also reached number three in Canada.

Billboard described the live version as an "easy rocker" and said that the portion of the song where Frampton sings the title lyrics made "an effective hook."  Cash Box called it "an excellent tune" explaining that "primarily, this is an acoustic tune, and Frampton sings with sensitivity over the soft backing." Record Worldsaid that although the studio single released the prior year didn't sell well, "this single is...headed for the top."

In 2017, Frampton discussed this song while talking to Washington D.C. lawmakers about inequitable revenue payments from streaming music services like iTunes and Spotify. "For 55 million streams of 'Baby I Love Your Way', I got $1,700," said Frampton. "Their jaws dropped and they asked me to repeat that for them."

Track listing
 7-inch single – United States (1975)
 "Baby, I Love Your Way" – 3:17 (Edited from the LP version that runs 4:43)
 "(I'll Give You) Money" – 4:35

Live version
 7-inch single – United States (1976)
 "Baby, I Love Your Way" – 3:28 (Edited from the LP version that runs 4:43)
 "It's a Plain Shame" – 4:21

Charts

Weekly charts

Year-end charts

Certifications

Will to Power version

The American neo-disco group Will to Power recorded a medley of "Baby, I Love Your Way" and "Free Bird", which reached No. 1 in the US.

Big Mountain version

American reggae/pop band Big Mountain released a cover of "Baby, I Love Your Way" in February 1994, which appeared on the soundtrack of the film Reality Bites, starring Winona Ryder, Ethan Hawke and Ben Stiller. This version achieved major worldwide success, reaching number six on the US Billboard Hot 100 and number two on the UK Singles Chart (being kept off the top spot by "Love is All Around" by Wet Wet Wet). The single reached the top ten in many countries across Europe, including topping the charts of Denmark, Spain, and Sweden. It also reached the top five in Australia and New Zealand, as well as in Canada, where it peaked at number two.

Critical reception
Larry Flick from Billboard magazine reviewed the song favorably, calling it an "earthy rendition" which is "right in the pocket of current trends." Dr. Bayyan from Cash Box wrote, "This song deals with the beauty of the subject that the group is focusing on. The lyrics are very intense and spiritual and are enhanced by the raw string and wind instruments which captivate the imagination." Fell and Rufer from the Gavin Report noted that this cover "has teeth" and "could be big." Pan-European magazine Music & Media commented, "Another '70s pop classic has come out of the reggae grinder to enjoy its second youth in the '90s. Peter Frampton wrote it, not knowing that one day it would appear in the Reality Bites film." Alan Jones from Music Week gave it four out of five, adding that "this is a lightweight reggae cover", and it "is definitely in a summery mood."

Music video
The accompanying music video for the song was directed by Matti Leshem and premiered in April 1994.

Track listing
 CD single – Europe (1994)
 "Baby, I Love Your Way" – 4:28
 "Baby, I Love Your Way" (6 Point 6 on the Richter Scale mix) – 6:54
 "Baby, te quiero a tí" – 4:40

Charts

Weekly charts

Year-end charts

Certifications

Release history

Walter Jackson version
Walter Jackson released a cover of the song in 1977.  It reached number 19 on the U.S. R&B chart.

References

1970s ballads
1975 songs
1976 singles
1994 singles
A&M Records singles
Bertelsmann Music Group singles
British soft rock songs
European Hot 100 Singles number-one singles
Giant Records (Warner) singles
Live singles
Number-one singles in Denmark
Number-one singles in Norway
Number-one singles in Sweden
Peter Frampton songs
Pop ballads
RCA Records singles
Rock ballads
Song recordings produced by Peter Frampton
Songs written by Peter Frampton